The tornado outbreak of August 8–9, 1993 was a small tornado outbreak that occurred over the Upper Midwest of the United States for a period of two days. An F0 tornado near Littlefork, Minnesota lifted and moved a mobile home, killing its two occupants. It is Minnesota's most recent single tornado to cause multiple deaths. Other minor tornadoes occurred in Minnesota, Iowa and Wisconsin, causing limited damage.

Meteorological synopsis
At about 6:00 PM CST (23:00 UTC) a sea-level cyclone and occluded front were located over North Dakota. Lifted Indices (LI) at the time CDT were also low, and thunderstorms were starting to develop in the Eastern Dakotas. In response to the storms, the National Severe Storms Forecast Center (NSSFC) issued a tornado watch for the eastern Dakotas. At 11:55 PM CST (0440 UTC) the outbreak's first confirmed tornado was reported near Gully, Minnesota. As a result of the tornado a Tornado Warning was issued for Clearwater County; the storm's next location. Ten minutes later at 12:05 PM CST (0450 UTC) another tornado, rated an F0, was reported near Roseau, Minnesota. After the two August 8th tornadoes, most local warnings were allowed to expire, as local radar did not determine any of the storms to be severe. During the early morning hours of August 9 Duluth radar indicated multicellular convection near the Littlefork, Minnesota area that was associated with an outflow boundary from the earlier Dakota storms. At 1:35 AM CST (0735 UTC) a deadly F0 tornado touched down unexpectedly near Littlefork, in association with the multicellular thunderstorm. Unstable air from the day before persisted over much of the upper Midwest, and allowed storms to form over much of the area. On the night of August 9th the strongest tornado of the outbreak, an F2, occurred near New Hampton injuring 2 people. Another cluster of thunderstorms occurred over Wisconsin, producing 3 relatively minor tornadoes.

Confirmed tornadoes

August 8 event

August 9 event

Littlefork, Minnesota

The tornado near Littlefork lifted a mobile home and moved it  to the northeast of the original site. The two occupants of the home were killed and the tornado caused $50,000 in damage. National Weather Service officials first believed the tornado to be "straight-line winds", but after an investigation they determined that a tornado had occurred at the site.

References

External links
NWS Duluth Summary

Tornadoes of 1993
Tornadoes in Wisconsin
F2 tornadoes
Tornadoes in Iowa
Tornadoes in Minnesota
Tornado